Autocharis albiplaga is a moth in the family Crambidae. It was described by George Hampson in 1913. It is found in South Africa.

References

Endemic moths of South Africa
Moths described in 1913
Odontiinae
Moths of Africa